A pendeloque is a pear-shaped modification of the round brilliant cut used for diamonds and other gemstones.

See also
 Briolette
 Cut (gems)

References

Gemstone cutting